San Carlo is a village in the Val Poschiavo in the canton of Graubünden, Switzerland.

The village lies on the southern approach to the Bernina Pass, and at one time was responsible for the maintenance of the road over the pass. It has a parish church, known as San Carlo Borromeo and built in 1613, and a primary school. The current road to the pass, Hauptstrasse 29, passes through the village.

The outfall of the station is fed into the Poschiavino river. Alongside the power station is an operations centre, responsible for managing all the production facilities and networks owned by Repower in Switzerland, including the Robbia station.

References

Poschiavo